Aidan Mackenzy Bryant (born May 7, 1987) is an American actress, comedian, writer, producer, and singer. Bryant is most notable for being a cast member on the NBC late-night sketch comedy series Saturday Night Live for ten seasons, joining the show for its 38th season in 2012, and leaving at the end of its 47th season in 2022. For her work on the series, she was nominated for three Primetime Emmy Awards, including two nominations for Outstanding Supporting Actress in a Comedy Series. Her other work includes a voice role in the animated series Danger & Eggs (2017) and the Netflix adult animated series Human Resources. She played a starring role in the sitcom Shrill (2019–2021); for the latter, she also served as writer and executive producer and was nominated for the Primetime Emmy Award for Outstanding Lead Actress in a Comedy Series.

Early life
Bryant was born in Phoenix, the daughter of Georganne (née Vinall) and Tom Bryant. Her mother owns a boutique called Shop Frances in Phoenix. Bryant is of English, Irish, and German descent. She has one brother. She graduated from Xavier College Preparatory in 2005. Her parents took her to improv workshops at the now-defunct Arizona Jewish Theatre Company.

She graduated from Columbia College in Chicago with a BA in 2009. At Columbia College, she participated in the college's comedy studies program, developed by the Theatre Department and The Second City.

Career

After Bryant graduated from Columbia College, she toured with the musical improv group Baby Wants Candy and was approached by Second City. She has performed with iO Chicago, The Second City and the Annoyance Theatre. She was a writer and ensemble member for both "Sky's the Limit, Weather Permitting" and "We're All In This Room Together" on the Second City e.t.c. Stage.

Bryant made her debut as a featured player on Saturday Night Live on September 15, 2012. She was promoted to a repertory player during her second season on the show.

In 2013, Bryant appeared with a recurring role in the second season of IFC's Comedy Bang! Bang!, playing the show's segment producer. Bryant also made an uncredited cameo appearance in The Amazing Spider-Man 2. She has made guest appearances on programs such as Broad City, Documentary Now!, The Awesomes, and Girls. In 2014, Bryant, Eli Bruggemann, Chris Kelly, Sarah Schneider, and Kate McKinnon were nominated for a Primetime Emmy Award in the category of Outstanding Original Music and Lyrics for the "Home for the Holiday (Twin Bed)". The music video sketch aired on December 21, 2013. She won the award for Supporting Actress in a Comedy Series at the 2015 EWwy awards which honor performances that were snubbed by the Emmys.

In 2016, Bryant had a recurring role as Alice in the Louis C.K. series Horace and Pete. In 2017, Bryant provided the voice of main character D.D. Danger on the animated series Danger & Eggs. In 2018, Bryant received a nomination at the 70th Primetime Emmy Awards for Outstanding Supporting Actress in a Comedy Series.

In 2019, Bryant starred in the Hulu series Shrill. After Bryant became involved with Shrill, as a co-writer, co-executive producer and as the main character, there was a question of whether she would return for the 2019–20 season of Saturday Night Live although Lorne Michaels encouraged her to work on both shows. Bryant stated that she would work 12-hour days on Shrill and then at SNL afterward, making for 22-hour days. Shrill would run for three seasons ending in May 2021, and Bryant was told that its third season would be the last one after it was shot. Bryant planned to exit SNL after its 45th season, however the COVID-19 pandemic caused her to reconsider leaving after "one last normal year" that concluded with the 2021-2022 47th season.

In 2021, Bryant had signed an overall deal with Universal Television. She currently voices Emmy on the adult animated series Human Resources, a spin-off of Big Mouth which premiered on March 18, 2022.

Recurring characters on SNL

One of the students in the "Shallon" (Nasim Pedrad) sketches
Morgan, co-host of Girlfriends Talk Show, who always gets shunned or ignored by her friend Kyra (Cecily Strong) in favor of a cooler guest
Tonker Bell, Tinker Bell's rude-mannered half-sister, whose dad is a house fly
One of the actors in a dramatic High School Theater production, who attempt to make broad points about society's issues
Li'l Baby Aidy, a characterization of herself in the show's all-female music videos (so called because she was the youngest [the "baby"] of the current female cast)
Melanie, a flirtatious young teen with a romantic spark for mature gentlemen – said gentlemen being her friends' fathers
An unnamed girl who appears in porno movie scenarios and is oblivious to their sexual nature – in Hot for Teacher 8, she tried to ask her teacher, Miss Dayworth (Amy Schumer), for help on the unspecified assignment; in The Doctor Is In... My Butt 4, she thinks Dr. Rockhard (Adam Driver) is a real doctor; and in Skank Babysitter 17, she thinks her babysitter Miss Jasmine (Heidi Gardner) invited a pizza delivery man (Chance the Rapper) over for dinner.
Sarah Huckabee Sanders, former White House Press Secretary 
Carrie Krum, 7th grade travel expert
Ted Cruz, Texas Senator

Personal life
Throughout her adolescence, Bryant dealt with self-esteem issues related to her weight. Acting and performing improv allowed her to become more confident as a person and as an actress.

On April 28, 2018, Bryant married comedian Conner O'Malley, who was a writer on Late Night with Seth Meyers. They met in 2008 as performers at the Annoyance Theatre in Chicago, and became engaged in 2016.

Filmography

Film

Television

Webseries

Awards and nominations

References

External links
 
 

1987 births
21st-century American actresses
Actresses from Phoenix, Arizona
American film actresses
American impressionists (entertainers)
American people of English descent
American people of German descent
American people of Irish descent
American sketch comedians
American television actresses
American women comedians
Columbia College Chicago alumni
Comedians from Arizona
Living people
21st-century American comedians
Articles containing video clips